S V Joshi High School is a school in Dombivli, Maharashtra, India. The very first classes of this school ran under banyan tree in the Ganapati Temple which is a Gram-Daivat. It was led by Late Sakharam Vaman Joshi, after whom the school was named.

The school provides education from junior kindergarten to S.S.C. Previously it was only a Marathi Medium school but have started providing education in Semi-English medium. A few years ago, the school had added a junior college. The year 2011-12 marked the 75th anniversary of the school. 
Admission started for 5th to 10th std.

Athletics 
This school has three grounds and two cricket practise pitches under nets. It won the Famous Cricket Tournament in Kalyan-Dombivali Region Inter-school Championship Amar Paladhe Memorial Trophy in three consecutive years.

Notable alumni 
 Ajinkya Rahane, Indian Cricketer
 Mahesh Limaye, Film director, Cinematographer
Pratap Surnaik, MLA Thane Ovla
Nilesh Kulkarni, Former Indian cricketer
 Rashmi Thakerey, Wife of Uddhav Thackeray

References 

Education in Kalyan-Dombivli
Schools in Thane district